CheddarU is an American closed-circuit network available on 600 U.S. college campuses owned by Cheddar, as part of internally originated cable systems that are a part of on-campus housing or college closed-circuit television systems. In 2018, Cheddar acquired MTV Networks on Campus, a former division of Viacom, to launch the channel. Cheddar also acquired RateMyProfessors.com, which was part of the MTVU division since 2007, in October 2018.

History

MTV Networks' proposal for a channel targeting college students, tentatively called MTV University, became public in February 2002. According to The New York Times, the channel was seeking to compete with Burly Bear Network, which was available to 450 campuses and had been attracting nearly a million viewers a week, along with College Television Network (CTN) and the most recent entrant at the time, Zilo.

Seven months later, after CTN ended up in financial trouble and as National Lampoon had just acquired the defunct Burly Bear, MTV Networks acquired CTN for $15 million.

In February 2008, MTV Networks discontinued VH1 Uno, a sparsely viewed Spanish language music video channel, and replaced it with MTVU, to expand the channel into traditional cable distribution.

In May 2018, Cheddar TV acquired Viacom's MTV Networks on Campus; outlets associated with that service will be converted to carry CheddarU, a new secondary feed which will stream content from the flagship financial-news streaming service and segments from Cheddar Big News to 9 million students on more than 600 campuses; universities which previously screened MTV Networks on Campus will continue to receive CheddarU at no cost in exchange for access to the campus. MTVU continues to be available to linear TV platforms via Viacom. Universities that qualify, can receive the CheddarU service for free. CheddarU is part of the ChedNet division of Cheddar, a division focusing on bringing the service to public screens such as gyms, bars, airports, hotels and other public venues.

References

External links

Altice USA
Television channels and stations established in 2002
English-language television stations in the United States
Former Viacom subsidiaries
Companies based in New York City
2018 mergers and acquisitions